The 2009 Chongqing mine blast was a gas explosion that occurred at a coal mine in Southwestern China in Qijiang County, Chongqing.

Explosion
The accident happened on 30 May 2009 around 11 a.m. at Tonghua Coal Mine in Qijiang County, when 131 miners were working underground. The Tonghua mine is affiliated with the state-owned Songzao Mining Bureau of Chongqing.  The death toll reached 30 people and 101 miners were rescued, according to state media. Of those rescued, 59 were injured, including four in serious condition.

The cause of the accident was an illegal practice which violated mining rules, and an excessive amount of explosives directly triggered the accident.

Police detained three people: the owner of the coal mine, chief engineer, and project manager.

See also

Coal power in China

References

Coal mining disasters in China
2009 mining disasters
2009 disasters in China
Explosions in 2009
History of Chongqing